Gordon John Edward "Tinkle" Bell (March 13, 1925 – November 3, 1980) was a Canadian professional ice hockey goaltender.

In the 1945–46 season he made 8 appearances for the Toronto Maple Leafs. He would not play another NHL game for 10 more years when he suited up for the New York Rangers in 2 playoff games during the 1955–56 season.

Bell played several seasons in the minor league American Hockey League. He began his pro career in 1942–43 with the Buffalo Bisons of the AHL. After a two-season absence from pro hockey, he split the 1944–5 season between Toronto and the Providence Reds. He died in Belleville, Ontario on November 3, 1980.

His brother Joe Bell also played in the NHL.

Career statistics

Regular season and playoffs

International

Awards and achievements
Turnbull Cup (MJHL) Championship (1942)
Memorial Cup Championship (1942)
Calder Cup (AHL) Championship (1943)
AHL First All-Star Team (1943)
USHL Second All-Star Team (1949)
Honoured Member of the Manitoba Hockey Hall of Fame

References

External links
 
 Gordon Bell's biography at Manitoba Hockey Hall of Fame

1925 births
1980 deaths
Buffalo Bisons (AHL) players
Canadian expatriate ice hockey players in the United States
Canadian ice hockey goaltenders
Fort Worth Rangers players
Hollywood Wolves players
Ice hockey people from Manitoba
Louisville Blades players
New York Rangers players
Omaha Knights (USHL) players
Ontario Hockey Association Senior A League (1890–1979) players
Pittsburgh Hornets players
Portage Terriers players
Providence Reds players
Sportspeople from Portage la Prairie
Springfield Indians players
Syracuse Warriors players
Toronto Maple Leafs players
Trois-Rivières Lions (1955–1960) players
Washington Lions players